Erdheim–Chester disease (ECD)  is an extremely rare disease characterized by the abnormal multiplication of a specific type of white blood cells called histiocytes, or tissue macrophages (technically, this disease is termed a non-Langerhans-cell histiocytosis). It was declared a histiocytic neoplasm by the World Health Organization in 2016. Onset typically is in middle age, although younger patients have been documented. The disease involves an infiltration of lipid-laden macrophages, multinucleated giant cells, an inflammatory infiltrate of lymphocytes and histiocytes in the bone marrow, and a generalized sclerosis of the long bones.

Signs and symptoms
Long bone involvement is almost universal in ECD patients and is bilateral and symmetrical in nature. More than 50% of cases have some sort of extraskeletal involvement. This can include kidney, skin, brain and lung involvement, and less frequently retroorbital tissue, pituitary gland and heart involvement is observed.

Bone pain is the most frequent of all symptoms associated with ECD and mainly affects the lower limbs, knees and ankles. Exophthalmos occurs in some patients and is usually bilateral, symmetric and painless, and in most cases it occurs several years before the final diagnosis. Recurrent pericardial effusion can be a manifestation, as can morphological changes in adrenal size and infiltration.

A review of 59 case studies by Veyssier-Belot et al. in 1996 reported the following symptoms in order of frequency of occurrence:
 Bone pain
 Retroperitoneal fibrosis
 Diabetes insipidus
 Exophthalmos
 Xanthomas
 Neurological and central nervous system involvement
 Dyspnea caused by interlobular septal and pleural thickening
 Kidney failure
 Hypopituitarism
 Liver failure

Diagnosis
Radiologic osteosclerosis and histology are the main diagnostic features. Diagnosis can often be difficult because of the rareness of ECD as well as the need to differentiate it from LCH. A diagnosis from neurological imaging may not be definitive. The presence of symmetrical cerebellar and pontine signal changes on T2-weighted images seem to be typical of ECD, however, multiple sclerosis and metabolic diseases must also be considered in the differential diagnosis. ECD is not a common cause of exophthalmos but can be diagnosed by biopsy.  However, like all biopsies, this may be inconclusive. Video-assisted thoracoscopic surgery may be used for diagnostic confirmation and also for therapeutic relief of recurrent pericardial fluid drainage.

Histology
Histologically, ECD differs from Langerhans cell histiocytosis (LCH) in a number of ways. Unlike LCH, ECD does not stain positive for S-100 proteins or Group 1 CD1a glycoproteins, and electron microscopy of cell cytoplasm does not disclose Birbeck granules.  Tissue samples show xanthomatous or xanthogranulomatous infiltration by lipid-laden or foamy histiocytes, and are usually surrounded by fibrosis. Bone biopsy is said to offer the greatest likelihood of reaching a diagnosis. It would appear that approximately half these patients harbor point mutations of the BRAF gene at codon 600 substituting the amino acid glutamine for valine. In some, there is histiocyte proliferation, and on staining, the section is CD68+ and CD1a-.

Treatment
There are two FDA-approved targeted drugs to treat ECD. 

Vemurafenib, an oral agent approved in 2019, targets the BRAF protein. It was approved after showing dramatic efficacy in ECD patients harboring the BRAF V600E mutation.
 Cobimetinib, an oral inhibitor of MEK1 and MEK2, was approved in November 2022.

Other treatment options include:
 Interferon-α
 High-dose corticosteroid therapy

Chemotherapy
Pexidartinib, a drug that targets a mutation in the CSF1R pathway and has shown sustained, complete response in limited use.
 Radiation therapy
 Surgical debulking
 Ciclosporin

Prognosis
Erdheim–Chester disease was previously associated with high mortality rates. However, long-term survival is now more promising. Recent studies have reported that some patients receiving targeted therapies showed no disease progression. Targeted therapies using BRAF, MEK and/or other inhibitors have been dramatically efficacious. In 2019, the Mayo Clinic published guidelines for the diagnosis and treatment of the disease, stressing the importance of genetic testing: "Recent insights into their genomic architecture demonstrating mitogen-activated protein kinase/extracellular signal-regulated kinase pathway mutations have now enabled potential treatment with targeted therapies in most patients."

Epidemiology 
Approximately 500 cases had been reported in the literature as of 2014. ECD affects predominantly adults, with a mean age of 53 years.

History
The first case of ECD was reported by the American pathologist William Chester in 1930, during his visit to the Austrian pathologist Jakob Erdheim in Vienna.

Society and culture

The Erdheim–Chester Disease Global Alliance is a support and advocacy group with the goal of raising awareness of and promoting research into ECD. ECD families and patients are also supported by the Histiocytosis Association, Inc.

Media
In the TV show House, season 2 episode 17, "All In", the final diagnosis of a 6-year-old boy who presents with bloody diarrhea and ataxia is Erdheim–Chester disease.

References

Further reading

External links 
 

Rare diseases
Histiocytosis
Skeletal disorders
Syndromes affecting blood